Angelic Pretty (アンジェリックプリティ) is a Japanese fashion company specialized in lolita fashion, founded in 1979 under the name Pretty - later changed to its current name in 2001.
Various items, primarily of the sweet lolita sub-style, such as accessories, coats, dresses, jumper skirts, blouses, cutsews, skirts, headdresses, petticoats and bloomers, shoes, socks, bags, etc. are up for sale.

As well as the brand's popularity in Japan, Angelic Pretty is one of the most well known Lolita brands worldwide.

In 2008, the company opened an official English-language site to cater for their fast-growing foreign customers.

Brand Concept 
"Angelic Pretty provides adorable clothes covered in lace, frills and ribbons like that of the fairytale princess you dreamed about as a little girl.  We want girls to never lose sight of that dream and this is a brand for girls who want to keep that dream alive"
.

At Cosplay Oneesan's Event "Yumemiru Musical Paradise", brand designers Maki and Asuka were interviewed about the concept of Angelic Pretty, elaborating on the use of the colour pink. They said that they "try to use the colour in as many ways as possible and change it with the season, the fashion trends, with the over-all aim to make it pretty".
When asked about the story of the designs, both designers were reluctant to respond, since "it is up to the girls that wear the clothing to write their own princess story".

All Angelic Pretty stores are decorated almost exclusively with the colour pink, which further shows the brand concept's connection to this colour and underlines the references to fairytale princesses.

Stores 
Angelic Pretty's main store is in the department store Laforet in the Harajuku neighborhood of Tokyo, but there are also currently stores in Shinjuku (Tokyo), Osaka, Nagoya, Sendai, Utsunomiya, Hiroshima, Yokohama, Kanazawa, Fukuoka, Okayama, and Sannomiya. Establishments outside Japan include two stores in Shanghai and Chengdu, China.

At Cosplay Oneesan, brand designers Maki and Asuka stated that Angelic Pretty wishes to open a store in the United States. On October 4, 2010, the Angelic Pretty English-language website was launched, and a public announcement was made that an official boutique would be opened in San Francisco's Union Square district in November 2010.

The San Francisco store was opened on November 20, 2010, and it is a "combination store" with brand Harajuku Hearts - half of the store sells Angelic Pretty brand items and the other half sells Harajuku Hearts items. Harajuku Hearts itself sells other Lolita style clothing and accessories from brands such as Enchantlic Enchantilly, Atelier Pierrot, Black Peace Now, Sex Pot Revenge, and Putumayo. The store is decorated to show the contrast between the brands: on the left half of the store are the more gothic and punk brands of Harajuku Hearts and on the right are the sweet pinks and pastels of Angelic Pretty.

In Paris, an official Angelic Pretty corner opened in 2009, definitely becoming an official Angelic Pretty store in 2010. It closed in 2013, after the annual Paris Tea Party, in July. The 7th of July 2016, a new Angelic Pretty store was opened in the heart of Paris, which is still open.

Brand designers Maki and Asuka 
Two of the designers which have made themselves well known throughout the lolita community are Maki and Asuka. They have appeared at the American event PMX hosted by Cosplay Oneesan during November 2007, and Cosplay Oneesan's standalone event "Yumemiru Musical Paradise" in 2008  where a designer panel was held, and a recreation of one of the Japan Angelic Pretty stores.

Maki and Asuka appeared at Oneesan Inc's Gothic and Lolita event "Fantaisies dans le Monde des Rêves" on May 28–31, 2010 In San Jose California along with the designers of Chantilly, Atelier-Pierrot, Vivcore, and Sweet Rococo.

Maki is from the Saitama prefecture. She started working for Angelic Pretty in 2003 and is one of the main designers. She majored in Illustration from a vocational school. Before graduating she brought some of her art to Angelic Pretty to answer their ad and was offered a job, working her way through school. Originally she wasn't interested in clothing design as "you can't draw scenery on clothes, so I thought I would prefer drawing." She is in charge of designing socks as well as choosing the base cloth and thread. 

Asuka is from Kanagawa prefecture. She started at Angelic Pretty in 2001. She is another of the main designers, however she also oversees all press work. She majored in Design during high school and entered a vocational school for clothing and accessories. Similar to Maki she answered an ad that Angelic Pretty had placed and was offered a job. She designs shoes, bags and parasols.

References

External links 
 Official site of Angelic Pretty
 Official English site of Angelic Pretty
 Anime News Network Anime News Network on Yumemiru Musical Paradise
 Angelic Pretty USA official site Angelic Pretty USA

Clothing brands of Japan
Retail companies established in 1979
Clothing companies established in 1979
Clothing retailers of Japan
Lolita fashion
1979 establishments in Japan